is a railway station in the city of Tokoname, Aichi, Japan, operated by Meitetsu.

Lines

Station layout
The station has two opposed elevated  side platforms with the station building underneath. The station has automated ticket machines, Manaca automated turnstiles and it is unattended.

Platforms

Adjacent stations

Station history
Taya Station was opened on March 29, 1913 as a station on the Aichi Electric Railway Company. The Aichi Electric Railway became part of the Meitetsu group on August 1, 1935. The station was closed in 1944, but was reopened on October 1, 1949. The station has been unattended since October 1, 1979. The station was closed again from January 2002 to October 2003 due to construction which elevated the tracks and replaced the station building. In January 2005, the Tranpass system of magnetic fare cards with automatic turnstiles was implemented.

Passenger statistics
In fiscal 2016, the station was used by an average of 1,291 passengers daily (boarding passengers only).

Surrounding area
INAX

See also
 List of Railway Stations in Japan

References

External links

 Official web page 

Railway stations in Japan opened in 1913
Railway stations in Aichi Prefecture
Stations of Nagoya Railroad
Tokoname